"Global village" is the metaphoric village formed through the use of electronic media.

Global Village may also refer to:

Places
 Global Village (Dubai), cultural, entertainment and shopping destination located at Dubailand, Dubai
 Global Village Tech Park, a software technology park in Bengaluru, India

Arts and entertainment
 Global Village (American radio show), an American radio show
 Global Village (Canadian radio show), a Canadian radio show
 Global Village (TV series), an Australian television show

Telecommunications
 Global Village Communication, a manufacturer of consumer modems, now a division of Zoom Technologies
 Global Village Telecom, a Brazilian telecommunications company

Other uses
 Global Village, an international educational youth festival organised by The Woodcraft Folk

See also
 World village (disambiguation)